The Catholic University of Lyon (Université Catholique de Lyon), or the Lyon Catholic University also known as the Catholic Institute of Lyon (Institut catholique de Lyon), is a private university based in Lyon, France.

History

The Catholic University of Lyon has stood at the confluence of the Saône and Rhône Rivers in the center of Lyon since its founding. Its creation in 1875 was initiated by lay Catholics following passage of a law on the freedom of higher education. Inaugural classes began in 1875.

Since 2005, the Catholic University of Lyon has been located on two campuses that are close to each other in the center city:

The Carnot Campus houses the Faculty of Theology and Religious Sciences, the Faculty of Philosophy, Psychology and Education, the Faculty of Modern Languages and Literature including the ESTRI School of Translation and international relations, 

The Saint-Paul Campus houses the Faculty of Legal, Political and Social Sciences, the Faculty of Sciences and biotechnologies, Lyon Business School, ESDES together with the rectorate, the university administration, central university services, the Department of Humanities and the 'Lyon Polytechnic Institute'.

UCLy is now situated on three campuses, two within the heart of the city of Lyon (Carnot / Saint Paul) and the other, in Annecy, which opened at the start of the 2020 academic year.

UCLy is a non-profit-making organisation granted the status of a public interest private higher education institution (EESPIG) by the French government, and as such, it contributes to providing the public service of higher education.

The rector since September 2019 is the theologian Olivier Artus.

The university offers a government-backed diploma in religious freedom and secularism, designed especially for foreign Muslim imams; however, not enough people enroll in it.

Facts and Figures

11,000 students, including 1,100 from abroad 
310 permanent teaching staff 
255 administrative staff
6 Faculties 
5 vocational schools

Three types of courses

Traditional university courses with six faculties: 
Faculty of Legal, Political and Social Sciences
Faculty of Philosophy, Psychology and Education 
Faculty of Theology and Religious Sciences (Divinity, Interreligious studies...)
Faculty of Sciences (Biology, biological and medical sciences...)
Faculty of Modern Languages and Literature (French Literature, Modern Literature, English, Italian, Spanish, Chinese, Japanese...)
Professionally oriented courses at its 'schools': 
ESDES Business School 
ESTRI School of Translation and International Relations
ESQESE School of Environmental Quality and Safety 
ESTBB School of Biochemistry and Biology 
IFTLM School for Laboratory Technicians 
Specific courses at training centres and research laboratories 
Institute of French Language and Culture (ILCF) 
Pierre Gardette Institute, which promotes the languages and cultures of the Rhône-Alpes region
Lyon Institute of Human Rights (IDHL) 
Pastoral Institute for Religious studies (IPER) 
Institute Society and Family (ISF) 
International Centre for Local development studies (CIEDEL) 
Interdisciplinary Centre for Ethics (CIE)

University Library

The main library Henri de Lubac  contains 400,000 books and 2,000 journals in the areas of philosophy, history, literature, humanities, natural science and theology. 

The library belongs to the SUDOC network ('Service Universitaire de Documentation') which interconnects with some 3,000 libraries elsewhere in France.

See also
Education in France
 List of modern universities in Europe (1801–1945)

References

External links 
 

Universities and colleges in Lyon
2nd arrondissement of Lyon
Educational institutions established in 1875
Lyon
1875 establishments in France